John Turvill Adams (September 29, 1805 – March 30, 1882) was an American novelist. He was a member of the Connecticut legislature and former lawyer. He died in Norwich, March 30, 1882.

Early life

Adams was born September 29, 1805, of English parentage, in Demerara, South America. In 1810 his father, Richard Adams, removed to Norwich, Connecticut, from which place the son entered Yale College, where he graduated in 1824.  He began the study of law in the law school of the Hon. Samuel J. Hitchcock, of New Haven, in 1824, and while resident published a small volume of poems in 1825, but soon embarked in the dry-goods jobbing business in New York City, in partnership with Felix A. Huntington, of Norwich. It did not do well, and he abandoned it and returned to Connecticut.

Books

In 1828 he started a newspaper called the Telegraph, in Stonington, Connecticut, which was merged the next year in the Norwich Republican, of which Adams continued the editor until 1834.  About this time he was admitted to the bar, and in 1835 he was elected Judge of Probate, but held the office for only a short period, resigning it to remove from town, at first to Harrisburg, Pa., and, afterwards to Michigan. About 1844 he returned to Norwich, and in 1850 abandoned the practice of the law.

He devoted himself later to literary pursuits, and published several tales of American life, such as The Lost Hunter (N.Y., 1856), and The Knight of the Golden Melice (N.Y., 1860).

Senate

For the four years from 1860 to 1863 he represented Norwich in the Connecticut Legislature, and in 1864 he was a member, and acting President, of the Connecticut State Senate.

Marriages

On Dec. 20, 1826, he married Hannah P. Huntington, daughter of Joseph Huntington, of Norwich, who died in Michigan, leaving a son and daughter, who both died before him. On Sept. 7, 1839, he next married Elizabeth Lee, daughter of Benjamin Lee, of Norwich, and widow of James S. Dwight, of Springfield, Mass. She died in Springfield, Jan. 9, 1865. Their marriage produced no children.

References

External links
 
 

1805 births
1882 deaths
Politicians from Norwich, Connecticut
Yale Law School alumni
Connecticut lawyers
American male poets
American male novelists
American newspaper editors
Members of the Connecticut House of Representatives
Connecticut state senators
Presidents pro tempore of the Connecticut Senate
19th-century American poets
19th-century American novelists
19th-century American male writers
19th-century American politicians
American male non-fiction writers
Yale College alumni
Dutch emigrants to the United States
19th-century American lawyers